A cuauhxicalli or quauhxicalli (meaning "eagle gourd bowl") was an altar-like stone vessel used by the Aztec in sacrificial ceremonies, believed to be for holding human hearts. A cuauhxicalli would often be decorated with animal motifs, commonly eagles or jaguars. Another kind of cuauhxicalli is the Chacmool-type, which is shaped as a reclining person holding a bowl on his belly.

Gallery

References

Religious objects
Indigenous sculpture of the Americas
Aztec artifacts
Mesoamerican stone sculpture
Articles containing video clips